Arctosa virgo is a species of wolf spider in the family Lycosidae. It is found in the United States.

References

virgo
Articles created by Qbugbot
Spiders described in 1925